René Ariza (1940–1994) was a Cuban actor, director, and writer born in Havana, Cuba.

Biography
Ariza graduated from the Academia Municipal de Artes Dramáticas in 1959, eventually receiving the Premio de la Unión Nacional de Escritores y Artistas de Cuba (UNEAC) in 1967 for his play La vuelta a la manzana.

An opponent of the Castro regime, he was jailed in 1974 for his political views until Amnesty International intervened and he was released in 1979. Ariza left Cuba during the Mariel boatlift and settled in Miami, where he continued to develop professionally.

His theatrical work carries a marked political valence and has been produced primarily in the United States (and had been even prior to his departure from Cuba).

Some of his most well-known plays include Los tres cerditos y el lobo carnicero, the aforementioned La vuelta a la manzana, and El banquete. His unpublished work was destroyed during his time in prison, but he continued his creative pursuits until his death in California in 1994.

Works or publications

Notes and references

Further reading

External links

 The René Ariza collection is available at the Cuban Heritage Collection, University of Miami Libraries. This archival collection contains original drawings and photographs of René Ariza; audio cassettes and video tapes of Cuban music; and Ariza's personal recordings, manuscript poems and scripts for his plays, as well as personal correspondence and papers.
 Creator page for René Ariza in the Cuban Theater Digital Archive.
 Instituto Cultural René Ariza.
 Video of the 2010 Premios René Ariza ceremony, held at the University of Miami Libraries Cuban Heritage Collection. In 2010, the awards were given to the playwrights Raul de Cárdenas and Héctor Santiago and to the actress Magali Boix.
.

1940 births
1994 deaths
American writers of Cuban descent
Cuban male stage actors
Cuban theatre directors
Cuban dramatists and playwrights
Cuban male writers
Hispanic and Latino American dramatists and playwrights
20th-century American dramatists and playwrights
American male dramatists and playwrights
20th-century Cuban male actors
20th-century American male writers